Spooky toxin (SsTx) is a small peptide neurotoxin. It is found in the venom of Chinese red-headed centipedes (Scolopendra subspinipes mutilans), also known as golden head centipedes. It is originally composed of 76 amino acids (sequence MEKKIIFLVFLVALLALPGFISTEVIKKDTPYKKRKFPYKSECLKACATSFTGGDESRIQEGKPGFFKCTCYFTTG, disulfide bonds Cys43-Cys69, Cys47-Cys71), with a molecular weight of 6017.5 Daltons, but loses the first 23 residues and becomes 53 residues long (sequence EVIKKDTPYKKRKFPYKSECLKACATSFTGGDESRIQEGKPGFFKCTCYFTTG, disulfide bonds Cys20-Cys46, Cys24-Cys48). SsTx is currently thought to be unique to Scolopendra subspinipes mutilans.

By blocking KCNQ channels (preventing potassium from flowing into and out of cells) SsTx disrupts cardiovascular, respiratory, muscular, and nervous systems; where snake venoms typically only affect circulatory or nervous systems, and venom from spiders, scorpions, and snails typically only target nervous systems. This allows for golden headed centipedes to target larger prey up to 15 times their size.

Applications
The venom of the Scolopendra subspinipes mutilans is already being widely used as a traditional medicine in Asian countries. Claimed medicinal uses include antimicrobial, antibacterial, and anticancer.

See also 
Charybdotoxin

References 

Centipede toxins
Neurotoxins
Ion channel toxins
Potassium channel blockers
Protein toxins